Richard Solomon Brown (born September 21, 1965) is a Samoan-born former American football player who played linebacker for nine seasons in the NFL.

References

Living people
American football linebackers
Los Angeles Rams players
San Diego Chargers players
Cleveland Browns players
Minnesota Vikings players
San Diego State Aztecs football players
1965 births
American sportspeople of Samoan descent
Samoan players of American football
Sportspeople from Orange County, California
People from Westminster, California